The 1977 Army Cadets represented the United States Military Academy during the 1977 NCAA Division I football season. They claimed the Commander-in-Chief's Trophy for the second straight season.

Schedule

Personnel

Game summaries

UMass
Army's win over UMass was the 500th in school history. Leamon Hall threw five touchdown passes, including three to freshman Mike Fahnstock.

Villanova

Navy

    
    
    
    
    

Army finished with its first winning season since 1972.

Stats

QB Leamon Hall – 151/265 for 1,944 yards with 15 TD vs 17 INT
RB Greg King – 177 carries for 961 yards with 7 TD
RB Jim Merriken – 99 carries for 447 yards with 4 TD.  35 catches for 350 yards with 2 TD
TE Clennie Brundridge – 51 catches for 842 yards with 4 TD

Awards
 Homer Smith – Eastern Coach of the Year (New York Football Writers Association)

References

Army
Army Black Knights football seasons
Army Cadets football